Chovvanur Burial Cave is a prehistoric Megalith rock cut cave situated in Chowannur, of Thrissur District of Kerala. The cave can be accessed from single entry and its chamber is circular. The cave has a single chamber and two benches. The Archaeological Survey of India has declared this cave as centrally protected monument.

See also

 Archaeology in India
 Timeline of Indian history
 List of Indus Valley Civilisation sites
 List of archaeological sites by country#India
 List of archaeological sites by continent and age
 World Heritage Sites by country#India

References

Prehistoric India
History of Kerala
Megalithic monuments in India
History of Thrissur district
Archaeological sites in Kerala
Tourist attractions in Thrissur district